Kizawa Memorial Hospital (木沢記念病院, kizawa kinen byouin) is a semi-public non-for-profit general hospital located in central Japan. It is the flagship hospital of the Koseikai Health System (社会医療法人厚生会shakai iryo hojin koseikai). It serves the cities of Minokamo, Kani and surrounding municipalities with a combined population of more than 200,000 persons. It is one of the eight major centers for urgent care and disaster response designated by the Gifu Prefectural Government.

The hospital was founded in 1913 as The Recovery Clinic (回生院 Kaisei-In). By 1952, the clinic had become a small hospital (23 beds) and was renamed Kizawa Hospital after the founder. In 1966, the hospital had grown to 190 beds. The current hospital has 452 beds. In 2012, the hospital was ranked #17 nationwide in the private non-profit category.

Activity 

Statistics for Jan-Dec. 2013.

Admissions
First admissions: 9,033
Surgeries: 2,837
Outpatient visits: 251,279
ER presentations 
Walk-in: 16,465
Ambulance: 3,512
ER admissions: 2,721
Births: 345
CT: 26,048
MRI: 10,571
PET: 2,491
Tomotherapy: 10,038

Medical Technology 

daVinci Robotic Surgical Assistance System (2010)
3.0T MRI (2009)
320-row Dynamic CT Aquilion ONE (2008)
TomoTherapy Hi-Art (2005, 2008)
PET-CT (2006)

Staff 
Physicians: 107
Nurses, nurse aids and midwives: 500
Pharmacists: 19
Radiological and physiological technicians: 56
Rehabilitation therapists: 67
Administrative/other: 194

Notable Persons

Jitsuhiro Yamada 

CEO of Koseikai Health System since 2000. Neurosurgeon. International President of Lions Clubs International.

Yasuo Kitajima 

Director of Kizawa Memorial Hospital since 2009. Dermatologist. Best Doctors in Japan Award, 2010, 2011, 2012, 2013, 2014. Former director of Gifu University Hospital. Recurring guest on Takeshi Kitano's health-themed variety show.

Shigetoyo Saji 

Special advisor of Kizawa Memorial Hospital. Oncology surgeon. Current president of the Asian Clinical Oncology Society. Former director of Gifu University Hospital.

Accreditations 
JCAHC Accredited Hospital (#128)
MINDS Medical Information Network Distribution Service (Japan Ministry of Health and Labor)
VHJ, Voluntary Hospitals of Japan
Japan Council for Evaluation of Postgraduate Clinical Training
Gifu Prefectural DMAT Disaster Response Team Designated Hospital
Gifu Prefectural Designated Higher Brain Dysfunction Support Hospital

Affiliated Institutions 

Central Japan Medical Center for Prolonged Traumatic Brain Dysfunction (中部療護センター chubu ryogo senta)Operated by Kizawa Memorial Hospital, administered by National Agency for Automotive Safety and Victim’s Aid (NASVA) (独立行政法人自動車事故対策機構), a subsidiary of the MLIT. It has a 50-bed ward for patients with prolonged brain dysfunction due to traffic-related injury.
Dialysis Center112 patients (41 beds)
Tajimi City Hospital
Nozomi no Oka Mental Hospital
Ajisai Nursing College
Club M Medical fitness club.

Public Transport 
JR Mino-Ōta Station, 1 km
Meitetsu Nihon Rhine Imawatari Station, 5.5 km

References

External links 
Kizawa Memorial Hospital
Central Japan Medical Center for Prolonged Traumatic Brain Dysfunction

Hospitals in Japan
Voluntary hospitals